Estadio El Serpentario is a stadium in San Juan, Argentina. It has a capacity of 12,000 spectators.  It is the home of Sportivo Desamparados of the Primera B Nacional.

References

s
Buildings and structures in San Juan, Argentina